Fratellanza Sportiva Sestrese Calcio 1919 (in English Fratellanza means Brotherhood) is an Italian football club located in Sestri Ponente, a suburb of Genoa, Liguria. It currently plays in Eccellenza Liguria, having last been in Serie B of Northern Italy in 1947.

Colors and badge
Its colors are green and white.

Honours
In 1991 Sestrese won the Coppa Italia Dilettanti di Eccellenza.

During the first half of the 20th century Fratellanza Sportiva also had a Tamburello team, which won the national title ("Campione d'Italia") in 1927, 1928, 1929, 1948 and 1949.

Famous former coaches
 Dario Bonetti
 Ferenc Hirzer

External links
 Official homepage

 
Football clubs in Italy
Football clubs in Genoa
Serie B clubs
Serie C clubs
Serie D clubs
Association football clubs established in 1919
1919 establishments in Italy